Elihu Harlam Mason (March 23, 1831 – September 24, 1896) was a Union Army soldier in the American Civil War and a recipient of the United States military's highest decoration, the Medal of Honor, for his actions in the Great Locomotive Chase.

Biography
Mason joined the Army from Pemberville, Ohio in April 1861, and by April 1862 was serving as a sergeant in Company K of the 21st Ohio Infantry. During that month, he volunteered for a raid into Confederate territory to disrupt rail transport in Georgia. The mission failed, and all of the raiders were captured. In June, eight of the men, including the raid leader, James J. Andrews, were executed as spies. The remaining raiders, including Mason, made an escape from the Confederate prison on October 16, 1862. Very ill at the time, Mason was unable to keep up with the other soldiers and, at his own urging, was eventually left behind and recaptured by the Confederates. He and five other recaptured raiders were released in a prisoner exchange the next year, on March 18. For his actions during the mission, he was awarded the newly created Medal of Honor one week after being exchanged, on March 25, 1863. He was the fourth person ever to receive the medal.

Mason later became a commissioned officer and reached the rank of captain. He fought in the Battle of Chickamauga where he was again captured by the Confederates. He was paroled in December 1864, and discharged in May 1865.

After the war, Mason returned to Pemberville, Ohio. He died at age 65 and was buried at Pemberville Cemetery.

Medal of Honor citation
Mason's official Medal of Honor citation reads:
One of the 19 of 22 men (including 2 civilians) who, by direction of Gen. Mitchell (or Buell), penetrated nearly 200 miles south into enemy territory and captured a railroad train at Big Shanty, Ga., in an attempt to destroy the bridges and track between Chattanooga and Atlanta.

See also

List of American Civil War Medal of Honor recipients: A–F
List of Andrews Raiders

References

1831 births
1896 deaths
People from Wood County, Ohio
Union Army officers
American Civil War prisoners of war
United States Army Medal of Honor recipients
People of Ohio in the American Civil War
American Civil War recipients of the Medal of Honor
Great Locomotive Chase